Old Souls is the second studio album by Australian metalcore band Make Them Suffer. The album was released on 28 May 2015 through Roadrunner Records and was produced by Roland Lim.

Critical reception

The album received positive reviews from critics. KillYourStereo gave the album a positive review and stated: "Make Them Suffer have outdone themselves with Old Souls. The poetic lyrics and story-telling nature of the songs; the driving blast beats that actually drive the songs further; the symphonic and orchestral elements all result in a far more interesting soundscape than just mere chugs, low growls and breakdowns. Old Souls runs at a break neck pace. It is emotionally intense as they come, and its mix and production is top-notch (on ya Roland Lim). Equally, it's also far more layered and textured than most other metal albums out at the moment. There is so much to find and love within the 40 or so minutes that this album dwells within its running time. You would have to be fucking institutionalised and/or lack a solid internet connection to give this one a miss."

New Noise gave the album a positive review and stated: "The occasional cinematic structure, piano signature, and back-up vocals could be used more often, but they are all (at the least) very helpful in their places of Old Souls. Perhaps, by their third album, Make Them Suffer will have learned to better utilize these strong points. As far as this one goes, Old Souls is a strong enough metalcore release to adequately kill your time for the start of the summer vacation. It could be replaced quickly enough, but returns to it now and then could very well be expected. There's potential to be heard here."

Track listing

Personnel 
Credits adapted from Discogs.

Make Them Suffer
 Sean Harmanis – unclean vocals
 Nick McLernon – lead guitar, backing vocals
 Lachlan Monty – rhythm guitar
 Chris Arias-Real – bass
 Tim Madden – drums
 Louisa Burton – keyboards, piano, clean vocals

Additional personnel
 Roland Lim – production, mixing
 Marlon Ingle – production assistant
 Jason Suecof, Joey Sturgis and Forrester Savell – mixing
 Jay Huxtable – vocal recording

Charts

References 

2015 albums
Make Them Suffer albums